Andrei Yevgenyevich Sidyayev (born 25 October 1980) is a former Russian professional footballer.

Club career
He played 6 seasons in the Russian Football National League for 5 different teams.

References

1980 births
People from Sterlitamak
Living people
Russian footballers
Association football defenders
FC KAMAZ Naberezhnye Chelny players
FC Baltika Kaliningrad players
FC Volgar Astrakhan players
FC Sodovik Sterlitamak players
FC Chernomorets Novorossiysk players
FC Dynamo Bryansk players
FC Volga Ulyanovsk players
Sportspeople from Bashkortostan